Sancho Saunders (born 1805) was a member of South Carolina's House of Representatives during the Reconstruction era. He represented Chester County, South Carolina. He was documented as a literate Baptist minister who was a slave before the American Civil War. He was African American. His photograph was included in a montage of Radical Republican South Carolina legislators.

References

African-American politicians during the Reconstruction Era
African-American state legislators in South Carolina
1805 births
19th-century American slaves
Baptists from South Carolina
19th-century American politicians
Baptist ministers from the United States
Year of death missing